Since 2020, global cases of avian influenza subtype H5N1 have been rising, with cases reported from every continent as of February 2023 except for Australia and Antarctica.

Timeline

2020 
During 2020, reassortment, genetic "swapping" involving the swapping of DNA or RNA, between poultry and birds, led to the emergence of H5N1. The virus then spread across Europe, detected there in autumn, before spreading to Africa and Asia.

2021 
In May 2021, H5N1 was detected in wild red foxes in the Netherlands. It was later detected in December in Estonia in wild foxes.

2022 
In January 2022, an infection in an eighty-year-old man was reported, who raised ducks in England. Also in January, infections were reported from the United States in wild birds. In February, infections were reported from commercial poultry centres in the U.S., and Peru reported infections in sea lions. A human case of H5N1 was reported in the U.S. in April. The virus continued to spread further, infecting additional species of mammals. In September, Spain reported a human case; this was followed by a second case, in a person who worked at the same poultry farm as the first. In November, China reported a human case, infected due to contact with poultry. The case died from their infection.

2023

Cambodia 
In February 2023, Cambodia reported the death of a girl due to H5N1 infection after developing symptoms on 16 February. The girl's father also tested positive for the virus. The World Health Organisation described the situation as "worrying" and urged "heightened vigilance". Further sequencing determined that at least one of the two cases was from an older H5N1 clade, 2.3.2.1c, which had circulated as a common H5N1 strain in Cambodia for many years, rather than the more recent clade 2.3.4.4b, which had caused mass poultry deaths since 2020. This older clade had jumped to humans in the past yet hadn't previously resulted in any known human-to-human transmission.

On March 1, 2023, as Taiwan raised its travel alert for Cambodia, the WHO and the U.S. CDC, in concert with Cambodian authorities, determined that both of the individuals had been infected through direct contact with poultry.

References 

Avian influenza
2020s disease outbreaks
Influenza outbreaks